Guy Albert Carlton (January 16, 1954 – May 11, 2001) was an American weightlifter who won a bronze medal at the 1984 Summer Olympics and a silver medal at the 1979 Pan American Games.

Sporting career
Based out of Colorado, Carlton was the US National Heavyweight Champion twice, in 1981 and 1984.

At the 1984 Summer Olympics, Carlton was a bronze medalist in the heavyweight competition, held at Loyola Marymount University's Albert Gersten Pavilion. In his final clean and jerk, with the bronze medal secure, the 30-year old went for the gold medal by attempting a personal best lift of 225 kg, but was unable to get the bar to his chest. His previous best total, 377.5 kg, was enough for the bronze medal, behind Italy's Norberto Oberburger and Romanian lifter Ştefan Taşnadi. He remains, along with Mario Martinez, the last American male to win an Olympic weightlifting medal, as of 2016.

Personal life
Born in Amherst, Ohio to Guy E. and Elizabeth Carlton, he later moved to Illinois and went to high school in Decatur, then college at Eastern Illinois University. 

He married wife Jan Dodd in 1980 and was a father to four daughters.

Death
Carlton was found dead from gunshot wounds at his home in Arrowsmith, Illinois in May 2001. Notes found at the scene, as well as witness testimony, suggested that Carlton had intended to take his own life. His death was ruled a suicide.

References

1954 births
2001 deaths
2001 suicides
American male weightlifters
Olympic bronze medalists for the United States in weightlifting
Medalists at the 1984 Summer Olympics
Weightlifters at the 1984 Summer Olympics
Eastern Illinois University alumni
Sportspeople from Illinois
Suicides by firearm in Illinois
Pan American Games medalists in weightlifting
Pan American Games silver medalists for the United States
People from Amherst, Ohio
Weightlifters at the 1979 Pan American Games
Medalists at the 1979 Pan American Games
20th-century American people
21st-century American people